North Lemmon Township is a defunct civil township in Adams County, North Dakota, USA. The 1990 census recorded a population of 81. The population was an estimated at 66 people in 1999.

The township dissolved in 1999, and is now part of the Census-designated East Adams Unorganized Territory.

References

External links

Adams County
Defunct townships in Adams County, North Dakota